

Superlatives

Winners
The Kerala State Film Award for Best Background Music Director winners:

References
Official website
PRD, Govt. of Kerala: Awardees List
Malayalam Cinema

Kerala State Film Awards